Altererythrobacter fulvus is a Gram-negative, aerobic, rod-shaped, non-spore-forming and non-motile  bacterium from the genus of Altererythrobacter which has been isolated from forest soil.

References 

Sphingomonadales
Bacteria described in 2018